IView or iView may refer to:

 ABC iview, a video on demand and catch up TV service run by the Australian Broadcasting Corporation
 IrfanView, an image viewer, editor, organiser and converter program
 iView Media, a commercial digital asset management cataloging program
 IView Multimedia, a former software company